is a Japanese actor. He is represented with Ken-On. He graduated from Horikoshi High School. He is a member of Men On Style.

Biography
In December 2007, when he was a second grade junior high school student, inspired by actors in the entertainment industry in his generation such as Ryunosuke Kamiki and Mirai Shida, Irie applied for the Ken-On Group newcomer audition, and passed.

While joining his office in January 2008, he decided to make regular appearances in Absolute Boyfriend (Fuji Television) three days later, while his character was eighteen years old, four years older than his actual age (at the time), and made his acting debut as Kota Hayashi. Irie later appeared in dramas (Absolute Boyfriend, Seigi no Mikata, Oh! My Girl!!) keeping his "3 Cool" after his debut.

In 2011, his first starring role in a drama was Kingyo Club, and in 2014, he made his first leading film role in Kikaider Reboot.

Irie likes music from rock bands, the video 【Press On! tv】 #6 Shohei Ito × Jingi Irie –Guitar Chūkyū-hen– released in Ken-On's official YouTube in 2013, and listens to bands such as Quruli, Asian Kung-Fu Generation and Yura Yura Teikoku. He likes Quruli so much he visited their live performances personally.

Filmography

TV dramas

Variety

Films

Stage

Anime

Advertisements

Mobile dramas

Internet

Bibliography

DVD, videos

Photo albums

References

External links

Japanese male child actors
Japanese male voice actors
Ken-On artists
People from Tokyo
1993 births
Living people
Horikoshi High School alumni